Discoscaphites  is an extinct genus of ammonite. This genus may have been one of the few to have briefly survived the K-Pg mass extinction.

Distributions
Cretaceous of Greenland, Alabama, Arkansas, California, Colorado, Kansas, Maryland, Mississippi, Missouri, New Jersey, South Dakota, Tennessee, Texas, Wyoming, and North Carolina. Discoscaphites is present in the famous Pinna Layer of the Tinton Formation of New Jersey (above the iridium anomaly), with even possible records in the layer above, along with Eubaculites. some researchers prefer a conservative interpretation when dating the Pinna Layer, the other remains still suggest Discoscaphites was a K-Pg survivor, albeit restricted to 65 Ma.

References

External links

Scaphitidae
Ammonitida genera
Cretaceous ammonites
Late Cretaceous ammonites of North America
Campanian genus first appearances
Maastrichtian genus extinctions
Cretaceous United States
Maastrichtian life
Hell Creek fauna
Fossil taxa described in 1870